Judy was the name of these magazines:

Judy, a British satirical magazine, extant 1867–1907
Judy, a British girls' magazine, extant 1960–1991
Judy, a Japanese manga magazine published by Shogakukan, extant 1983–2008

See also
Aunt Judy's Magazine

References